= Kuntzville, West Virginia =

Kuntzville
- Unincorporated community
- Location within the state of West Virginia Kuntzville (the United States)
- Coordinates: 38°58′49″N 79°35′26″W
- Country: United States
- State: West Virginia
- County: Randolph
- Elevation: 2,267 ft (691 m)
- Time zone: UTC-5 (Eastern (EST))
  - Summer (DST): UTC-4 (EDT)
- GNIS ID: 1727091

Kuntzville was an unincorporated community in Randolph County, West Virginia.
